The men's sprint event was part of the track cycling programme at the 1920 Summer Olympics. There were 37 competitors from 11 nations, with each nation apparently limited to four cyclists (down from 12 the last time the event was held, in 1908). The event was won by Maurice Peeters of the Netherlands, the nation's first victory in the men's sprint. Two British cyclists, Thomas Johnson and Harry Ryan, were in the final as well, taking silver and bronze.

Summary

One day before the Olympic tournament, Peeters had become amateur world champion in track cycling. One day later he rode the Olympic 1000 m sprint, and of course he was considered a favourite. He lost in the first round, but his second place was enough to progress to the next round. He then won the quarter final and the semi-final. In the final, he rode against two British cyclists, Harry Ryan and Tiny Johnson. They tried to make use of their numerical advantage, and Ryan attacked, so that Peeters had to get him back. In the final corner, Johnson tried to come around the corner to win the race, but Peeters was ahead and kept his lead. The British team protested the race, arguing that Peeters had obstructed Johnson by forcing him up the bank, but the protest was denied.

Background

This was the fourth appearance of the event, which has been held at every Summer Olympics except 1904 and 1912. None of the finalists from 1908 returned. Peeters was the favorite.

Australia, Denmark, and Luxembourg each made their debut in the men's sprint. France made its fourth appearance, the only nation to have competed at every appearance of the event. For the first time, Germany did not compete in the men's sprint, having been excluded from the 1920 Games after World War I.

Competition format

Unlike modern sprint events (which use a flying 200 metre time trial to cut down and seed the field, followed by one-on-one matches), the 1920 sprint used a competition format featuring four main rounds and a two-round repechage. 

There were 12 first-round heats, mostly with three cyclists each but one with four. The top two in each heat advanced to the quarterfinals. The 24 quarterfinalists were divided into eight heats of three cyclists each; the winner of each quarterfinal advanced directly to the semifinals while the other two cyclists competed in the repechage. There were four repechage semifinals of four cyclists each, with the winner of each heat advancing to the repechage final. The four repechage finalists competed in a single heat, with the winner joining the eight quarterfinal winners in the semifinals. There were three semifinals of three cyclists each, with the winners advancing to the three-man final.

Records

The records for the sprint are 200 metre flying time trial records, kept for the qualifying round in later Games as well as for the finish of races.

* World records were not tracked by the UCI until 1954.

Thomas Johnson matched the Olympic record in heat 6, as did Gerald Halpin in heat 12. Halpin matched it again in quarterfinal 2. Johnson broke the record in the fifth quarterfinal, recording 11.8 seconds for the final 200 metres. 

Albert White, Harry Ryan (cyclist), and Maurice Peeters also tied the old record, but after Johnson had set a new one.

Schedule

Results

Round 1

Heat 1

Heat 2

Heat 3

Heat 4

Heat 5

Heat 6

Heat 7

Heat 8

Heat 9

Heat 10

Heat 11

Heat 12

Quarterfinals

Quarterfinal 1

Quarterfinal 2

Quarterfinal 3

Quarterfinal 4

Quarterfinal 5

Quarterfinal 6

Quarterfinal 7

Quarterfinal 8

Repechage

Repechage semifinals

Repechage semifinal 1

Young finished first, but had cut off Bellivier and was penalized by dropping him to second place, eliminating him and allowing Bellivier to advance.

Repechage semifinal 2

Repechage semifinal 3

Repechage semifinal 4

Repechage final

Semifinals

Semifinal 1

Semifinal 2

Semifinal 3

Final

References

Notes
 
 

Men's sprint
Track cycling at the 1920 Summer Olympics
Cycling at the Summer Olympics – Men's sprint